Francesco Castelluccio (born April 12, 1955) is an American sculptor. He studied anatomy at the Art Students League of New York and the School of Visual Arts, both in New York City.

Life and career 
Castelluccio was born to Italian-immigrant parents on April 12, 1955, in Newark, New Jersey. He owns Franco Fine Art Studio in Winter Springs, Florida.

In 2021, Castelluccio completed a bust of Martin Luther King Jr. to mark the opening of the Plant Riverside District in Savannah, Georgia. The work was commissioned by hotelier Richard C. Kessler, at a cost of around $110,000. The bust was approved by King's family, and it was unveiled by his sister-in-law Dr. Naomi King.

Selected works 

 The Double Helix-Mutation of Increased Compassion
 9/11 Pieta
 Martin Luther King Jr. bust (Savannah, Georgia)

References

External links 
 

1955 births
Living people
Artists from Newark, New Jersey
American male sculptors
20th-century American male artists
21st-century American male artists
Art Students League of New York alumni
School of Visual Arts alumni
Sculptors from New Jersey